Mirko Tedeschi (born 5 January 1989 in Negrar) is an Italian former professional cyclist, who competed professionally for  between 2014 and 2016.

Major results

2007
 1st  Team pursuit, National Track Championships (with Elia Viviani, Filippo Fortin and Mario Sgrinzato)
2010
 1st Trofeo Paolin Fornero
2012
 6th Ruota d'Oro
2015
 1st Stage 4 Vuelta a Venezuela

See also
Mirko Tedeschi (cyclist, born 1987)

References

External links

1989 births
Living people
Italian male cyclists
Cyclists from the Province of Verona